Giovinco is an Italian surname, may refer to:
Sebastian Giovinco, Italian international footballer
Giuseppe Giovinco, Italian footballer; younger brother of Sebastian 
Steve Giovinco, American photographer
Giovinco Ice Piedmont, Ice piedmont of Antarctica

Italian-language surnames